Kharadar General Hospital, formerly known as Cement Hospital, is a private hospital located in Kharadar, a neighborhood in Karachi, Pakistan. The hospital provides medical services to patients in various fields such as internal medicine, pediatrics, gynecology, surgery, and orthopedics, among others.

History
Kharadar General Hospital was founded in 1918.

In 1934, the Indian Hindu family of Seth Aesar Das and his son Aasan Mill gave one million rupees to a maternity home. The maternity home's foundation was laid by R.E. Gibson.

In 1936, Lady Graham opened the 50-bed maternity home.

In 1995, the hospital was renamed to Kharadar General Hospital.

In 2007, the hospital dedicated the Professor Abdul Ghaffar Billoo Operation Complex, comprising six operating rooms, in recognition of Abdul Ghaffar Billoo.

In 2013, an obstetrics and gynecology block was inaugurated at Kharadar General Hospital.

In 2016, Dow University of Health Sciences granted Kharadar General Hospital School of Nursing permission to initiate a graduate program in addition to Post-RN and BSCN programs.

References

External links
 Official website

1918 establishments in British India
Hospitals in Karachi
Karachi South District